The Journal of Neuroimaging is a bimonthly peer-reviewed scientific journal covering al aspects of neuroimaging. It was established in 1991 and is published by John Wiley & Sons on behalf of the American Society of Neuroimaging. Since 2015, the editor-in-chief is Rohit Bakshi (Harvard Medical School). The founding editor-in-chief was Leon Prockop. He was succeeded in 1999 by Lawrence Wechsler and in 2008 by Joseph Masdeu.

Abstracting and indexing 
The journal is abstracted and indexed in:

According to the Journal Citation Reports, the journal has a 2020 impact factor of 2.486.

Prockop award 
The John and Sophie Prockop Memorial Lectureship was established in 2005 by the founding editor, Leon Prockop, in memory of his parents. The recipient is the first author of a manuscript published in the prior year that has been judged to have outstanding value to the development and success of the journal or is the highest quality manuscript.

References

External links 
 
 American Society of Neuroimaging

Neuroimaging journals
Wiley (publisher) academic journals
Bimonthly journals
Publications established in 1991
English-language journals